Avon Riverside is the newest station (and current terminus) of the Avon Valley Railway. It opened on 1 May 2004.

Unlike the other two stations on the railway, there was no original mainline station here. 

The station was built in 2004 by the AVR, to allow connections to the local country park and the river landing stage.

There is no vehicle access to Avon Riverside. Access is provided for cyclists and walkers by the Bristol & Bath Railway Path, and by train from Bitton.

River Boats

Passengers can leave the train at Avon Riverside for a scenic boat trip on the River Avon. This is timetabled to link up with the railway service in both directions.

Services

References

External links

Avon Valley Railway Website

Heritage railway stations in Somerset
Railway stations in Great Britain opened in 2004
Railway stations built for UK heritage railways